"Crazy"  is the third single from Sydney band Expatriate's debut album In the Midst of This. It came as the  No. 4 most played song at Australia radio on the 26/03/07 chart. Promo CDs were issued of the song to radio stations however a physical single was never issued.

Video
The video debut on Rage on 13 April 2007. It features the band performing in Melbourne bar The Croft Institute.

Track listing 
Digital download/Promo CD

 "Crazy" (Radio Edit) – 3:35

References

External links
 Crazy (YouTube video)

2007 singles
Expatriate (band) songs
2007 songs
Dew Process singles